The 2018–19 Fenerbahçe Basketball season was the 105th season in the existence of the club. The team played in the Basketbol Süper Ligi (BSL) and in the European first tier EuroLeague.

Players

Squad information

Depth chart

Transactions

In

|}

Out

|}

Pre-season and friendlies

Friendly match

Zadar Doğuş Cup

Competitions

Overview

Basketball Super League

League table

Results summary

Matches

7th and 22nd rounds were bye due to Trabzonspor's withdrawing.

Playoffs

Quarterfinals

Semifinals

Finals

EuroLeague

League table

Results summary

Matches

Playoffs

Quarterfinals

Final Four

Semifinal

Third place game

Individual awards
EuroLeague MVP of the Round
 Jan Veselý – Regular Season, Round 1

EuroLeague MVP of the Month
 Jan Veselý, December

EuroLeague MVP of the Season
 Jan Veselý

Turkish Basketball Cup

Quarterfinal

Semifinal

Final

Turkish Basketball Presidential Cup

References

2018-19
Fenerbahçe
Fenerbahçe